Lewis Alexander Hilton (born 22 October 1993) is an English professional footballer who plays for the Tampa Bay Rowdies in USL Championship.

Career

Early career
Hilton spent five years playing for Plymouth Argyle as a youngster before spending a year with Exeter City. He then spent time at Hartpury College where he played against his future teammate Callum Ross. While at Hartpury College, Lewis worked with the PASS4Soccer Scholarships Agency to secure his scholarship at Young Harris College.

College and amateur
Hilton played four years of college soccer at Young Harris College between 2012 and 2015. While at Young Harris, Hilton was named two-time NSCAA All-American, and in 2015 also earned Division II Conference Commissioners Association Men's Soccer All-American honors.

While at college, Hilton played with Premier Development League side Ocala Stampede in 2014 and 2015.

Professional career

Hilton signed with United Soccer League club Charlotte Independence in January 2016.

Hilton signed with USL side Saint Louis FC in January 2018.

Hilton joined the Tampa Bay Rowdies on 17 December 2019.

References

External links
 

1993 births
Living people
English footballers
English expatriate footballers
Young Harris Mountain Lions men's soccer players
Ocala Stampede players
Charlotte Independence players
Saint Louis FC players
Tampa Bay Rowdies players
Association football midfielders
Expatriate soccer players in the United States
USL League Two players
USL Championship players
English expatriate sportspeople in the United States
Footballers from Cornwall
Sportspeople from Truro
Alumni of Hartpury College